The RP14BD is a diesel-electric switcher locomotive built by Railpower Technologies.  It is a "genset" locomotive, having two engine-generator sets.

The engines are computer controlled, with the computer stopping and starting engines on a rotating basis, as required to produce the horsepower needed at any given moment.

RP14BDs are rebuilt from older locomotives. They can be built with or without an operating cab.

See also 
 Genset locomotive

References

Further reading

External links 

 RJ Corman Railpower Genset & Hybrid Switchers

B-B locomotives
Diesel-electric locomotives of the United States
Railpower locomotives
EPA Tier 2-compliant locomotives of the United States
Rebuilt locomotives
Standard gauge locomotives of the United States
Locomotives with cabless variants